Glen Richards may refer to:
 Glen Richards (motorcyclist)
 Glen Richards (entrepreneur)

See also
 Glenn Richards, Australian musician